Koniarovce is a municipality in the Topoľčany District of the Nitra Region, Slovakia. In 2011 it had 623 inhabitants.

See also
 List of municipalities and towns in Slovakia

References

Genealogical resources

The records for genealogical research are available at the state archive "Statny Archiv in Nitra, Slovakia"

 Roman Catholic church records (births/marriages/deaths): 1696-1896 (parish B)

External links
http://en.e-obce.sk/obec/koniarovce/koniarovce.html
Official homepage
Surnames of living people in Koniarovce

Villages and municipalities in Topoľčany District